Vasily Pavlovich Kravkov (Russian: Василий Павлович Кравков; 1859–1920) was an Imperial Russian Army medical officer, Privy Councilor (1917), and author of diaries of the Russo-Japanese War and World War I.

Biography 

Vasily Pavlovich Kravkov was born a fourth child in the family of a non-commissioned officer Pavel Alexeyevich Kravkov (1826–1910), who served as a senior clerk in the office of the Chief Enlistment Officer of the Ryazan Governorate. According to the family legend, the scientist's mother Evdokia (Avdotia) Ivanovna (1834–1891), before wedding a "Kaluga petty bourgeois", was an illegitimate daughter of Konstantin Kavelin (1818–1885), a famous Russian historian, jurist and sociologist, one of the ideologists of Russian liberalism at the age of the reforms of Alexander II.

In 1871–1878 Vasily Kravkov attended the First Ryazan Gymnasium. In summer 1878 he left it with a silver medal and was admitted to the Imperial Military Medical Academy in Saint Petersburg, where he studied in 1878–1883.

In November 1883 Vasily Kravkov joined military service as a junior physician of the 26th "Mogilevsky" Infantry Regiment, then at the end of the year he was transferred to the 159th «Guriysky» Infantry Regiment. In 1884–1885 he was attached to the Orenburg Military Hospital.

In 1886 Vasily Kravkov was attached to the Orenburg Local Battalion where he served as a senior physician since 1887. Since February 1888 he served at the Kazan Military Hospital as a hospital physician.

In February 1888 Vasily Kravkov received a rank of Titular Councilor (IX grade of the Table of Ranks) with precedence since 1883, in May 1888 for long service he was promoted to Collegiate Assessor (VIII grade of the Table of Ranks) with precedence since 1886. In 1888 he also passed successfully the exams for the degree of the Doctor of Medicine at the Imperial Kazan University.

In 1889 Vasily Kravkov was sent to the Imperial Military Medical Academy for "improvement in sciences". By the decree of the Academic Conference of 11 February 1891 Collegiate Assessor Kravkov, a senior physician of the 11th "Fanagoriysky" Grenadiers Regiment, was awarded with the degree of Doctor of Medicine. In March 1891 he was promoted to Court Councilor (VII grade of the Table of Ranks).

In subsequent years Vasily Kravkov held posts of senior physician of the 137th "Nezhinsky" Infantry Regiment (1892-1895), of the Bryansk Local Arsenal (1895–1896), of the 138th "Bolkhovsky" Infantry Regiment (1896–1899). In 1899–1900 he was a senior physician of the Compounded Field Hospital of the 1st Brigade of the 35th Infantry Division of the XVII Army Corps in Ryazan. In 1901 he was promoted to State Councilor (V grade of the Table of Ranks).

In 1904–1905 Vasily Kravkov took part in the Russo-Japanese War. At the Battle of Liaoyang he worked for several days under the enemy fire. In 1906 he was promoted to Actual State Councilor (IV grade of the Table of Ranks).

In 1906–1908 Vasily Kravkov served in Moscow as a Corps physician, in 1908–1910 in Yaroslavl, where he was a physician of the 53rd and later 62nd Infantry Reserve Brigade. In 1910 he was transferred to the post of the XXV Army Corps physician and returned to Moscow.

In 1914–1917 Vasily Kravkov took part in World War I. In August–September 1914 in the XXV Army Corps (5th Army, Southwestern front) he took part in the Battle of Galicia, since September 1914 to December 1915 was the Cheef Assistant of the 10th Army Sanitary Department (Northwestern, later Western front), in December 1915 he was appointed XXXVII Army Corps doctor (12th Army, Northern front). Since April 1916 Vasily Kravkov served as a VII Siberian Army Corps doctor. In May 1917 he was promoted to Privy Councilor (III grade of the
Table of Ranks) by the Provisional Government. In July 1917 he retired from the army and returned to Moscow.

During the first years of the Soviet power Vasily Kravkov took part in the organization of the army medical bodies of the Russian Soviet Federative Socialist Republic. In October 1918 under his guidance an ambulatory care clinic of the Administration of Affairs of the Revolutionary Military Council of the Republic (Revvoyensoviet) was set up. Vasily Kravkov was in charge of it up to the autumn of 1919. Later he kept on cooperating with Red Army medical bodies.

5 July 1920 Vasily Kravkov was arrested by the VcheKa accused of abuses in the registration of dismissals from the military conscription. 13 July 1920 he was sentenced to capital punishment by the Presidium of the VCheKa.

Heritage 

In 1880–1900th Vasily Kravkov published a number of works on certain problems of practical medicine. In 1910 in Yaroslavl his book «Zaraznye faktory ludskogo zlopoluchiya» (Infectious factors of human affliction) dedicated to the problems of health work and environment was issued.

Vasily Kravkov's war diaries are the most important part of his heritage from historic point of view. He left notes of the periods of 1904–1906 and 1914–1917. In 1919 Kravkov donated his manuscripts to the Rumyantsev Museum in Moscow, now they are kept in the Department of personal funds of the Russian State Library.

An important fragment of his diary of the Russo-Japanese War dealing with the Battle of Liaoyang (1904) was published in the «Vremya i sudby» almanac (1991). In 2014 appeared the first Russian edition of the abbreviated Kravkov's diary of World War I period.

Memory

Awards 

 Order of St. Stanislaus 3rd Class (1888)
 Order of Saint Anna 3rd Class (1895)
 Order of St. Stanislaus 2d Class (1899)
 Order of Saint Anna 2d Class (1903, since 1904 with Swords)
 Order of Saint Vladimir 4th Class with Swords and Ribbon (1904)
 Order of Saint Vladimir 3rd Class with Swords (1905)
 Order of St. Stanislaus 1st Class (1915)
 Order of Saint Anna 1st Class (1915, since 1917 with Swords)

Family 

In 1892 Vasily Kravkov married Elena Alexeyevna Lukina (1870 – c. 1922), from the family of hereditary gentry of Ryazan Governorate. His son Sergey Vasilyevich Kravkov (1893-1951) was a Soviet psychologist and psychophysiologist. His daughter was Elizaveta Vasilyevna Kravkova (1895-1972).

Vasily Kravkov's brother was Nikolai Kravkov (1865-1924), a prominent Russian pharmacologist. His another brother was Sergey Pavlovich Kravkov (1873-1938), Professor of Saint Petersburg University, one of the first Russian soil scientists.

His nephew was Maximilian Alexeyevich Kravkov (1887-1937), a Soviet Siberian writer.

Works (Russian) 

 Кравков В.П. К вопросу об участии лимфатических желёз и костного мозга в острой малярийной инфекции / В.П. Кравков // Русская медицина. – 1885. –  №45. – С. 782–784.
 Кравков В.П. Чего нужно ожидать от прогресса оперативной хирургии в деле экстракции зубов / В.П. Кравков // Зубоврачебный вестник. – 1886. –  №10. – С. 36-37.
 Кравков В.П. Предварительные сообщение о желудочном пищеварении при болезни почек / В.П. Кравков // Больничная газета Боткина. – 1890. –  №30.
 Кравков В.П. К вопросу о деятельности желудка в течении затяжных заболеваний почек: дис…. д-ра медицины / В.П. Кравков. – СПб, 1891.
 Кравков В.П. К казуистике малярийных нефритов / В.П. Кравков // Больничная газета Боткина. – 1894. – №45. 
 Кравков В.П. Фибринозная пневмония в войсках рязанского гарнизона за минувшую зиму и весну / В.П. Кравков // Военно – медицинский журнал. – 1894. –  №1. – С. 12-14.
 Кравков В.П. Случай гнойного воспаления печени на почве малярийного заболевания / В.П. Кравков // Медицинское обозрение. – 1894. –  № 9. – С. 324-325.
 Кравков В.П. О результатах кожного втирания гваякола и креозота у лихорадящих больных / В.П. Кравков // Врач. – 1894. – №16. – С. 541-543.
 Кравков В.П. К вопросу о реабилитации военно-санитарного строя / В.П. Кравков // Русский инвалид. – 1903. – №105. – С.1063-1065.
 Кравков В.П. Заразные факторы людского злополучия и рациональные нормы практической постановки мер личной, общественной и правительственной борьбы с ними /В.П. Кравков.  –  Ярославль, 1910. – 500 с.
 Кравков В.П. Записки о семейной жизни: 1907-1914. / В.П. Кравков - М.: Книга по требованию, 2014. - 122 с. - .
 Кравков В.П. Великая война без ретуши. Записки корпусного врача / В.П. Кравков. - М.: Вече, 2014 - 416 с. - .

References 

 Головко Н.Г. Ровесница Советской Армии. // Центральная поликлиника № 1 Министерства обороны СССР. 50 лет. 1918-1968 гг. Материалы юбилейной врачебной научно-практической конференции. - Москва, 1968 – С 3.
 Поддубный М.В. Корпусный врач В. П. Кравков и его дневник Первой мировой войны. // Военно-медицинский журнал, т.336, No 2, 2015 - C. 85-88
 Российский М.А. 10-я Армия в Восточной Пруссии. Зимние операции 1914–1915 гг. в дневниках В.П. Кравкова // Известия лаборатории древних технологий, No 4 (13), 2014 - C. 45 - 72.
 Российский М.А. Дневники В.П. Кравкова за 1914–1917 гг. как исторический источник // Великая война: сто лет / под ред. М. Ю. Мягкова, К. А. Пахалюка. — М. ; СПб. : Нестор-История, 2014, с. 237-250, 302-322
 Российский М.А. Первая мировая война глазами доктора Кравкова. // История без купюр: от прошлого к настоящему. – М.: Международная жизнь (специальный выпуск), 2013, с. 89-137
 Российский М.А. Рига в 1916 году: взгляд русского военного врача. // Baltfort, No 4 (29), декабрь 2014 - C. 58 -68
 Российский М.А. «Смерть какого-то проходимца Распутина заслонила… все события фронта и тыла; и это — в момент великой трагедии, решающей судьбы русского народа!» Первая мировая война в дневниках В.П. Кравкова // Военно-исторический журнал, No 6, июнь 2015 - C. 63 - 69.
 Свет милосердия. Дневник участника русско-японской войны (1904-1905) дивизионного врача В.П. Кравкова // Время и судьбы. «Военные мемуары». Вып. 1. - М., «Воениздат» 1991. - С. 259–286.
 Узбекова Д.Г. Кравковы: два поколения ученых из Рязани / Д.Г.Узбекова – М.:Вече, 2014 – 352 с. 
 Узбекова Д.Г. В.П. Кравков - военный санитарный врач Русской императорской армии (К 100-летию начала Первой мировой войны // Проблемы социальной гигиены, здравоохранения и истории медицины, №4, 2014 - с. 51-54.

External links 

 Российский М.А. (2014) Великая война глазами доктора В.П. Кравкова
 Российский М.А. (2014) Летописец Первой мировой войны. Из Рязани. Дневники Василия Кравкова стали историческим документом
 Российский М.А. (2014) 7-й Сибирский армейский корпус в июньском наступлении 1917 года (по материалам личного фонда В.П. Кравкова в НИОР РГБ).
 Назаров О.Г. (2014) Нагая правда
 Назаров О.Г. (2014) Первый год Первой мировой глазами военного врача
 Историческая справка, семья Кравковых
 Русская армия в Галицийской битве. Из дневников военного врача В.П. Кравкова, август-сентябрь 1914 г.
 В память о знаменитой династии
 В Рязани открыли мемориальную доску выдающимся врачам Кравковым
 В Рязани открыли памятную доску Василию Павловичу и Сергею Васильевичу Кравковым
 Книга уроженца г. Рязани В. П. Кравкова «Великая война без ретуши. Записки корпусного врача» была представлена в областной библиотеке имени Горького
 Сизова И. В. (2014) Откровенно. Тайный советник – о великой войне

1859 births
1920 deaths
People from Ryazan
Military doctors of the Russian Empire
Memoirists from the Russian Empire
Russian military personnel of World War I
Recipients of the Order of St. Anna, 3rd class
Recipients of the Order of St. Anna, 2nd class
Recipients of the Order of St. Anna, 1st class
Recipients of the Order of St. Vladimir, 4th class
Recipients of the Order of St. Vladimir, 3rd class
S.M. Kirov Military Medical Academy alumni